Frederick Robinson may refer to:
 Sir Frederick Philipse Robinson (1763–1852), soldier
 F. J. Robinson, 1st Viscount Goderich (Frederick John Robinson, 1782–1859), politician
 Frederick Robinson, 2nd Marquess of Ripon (1852–1923), Liberal politician
 Frederick Robinson (1746–1792), English MP
 Frederick Robinson (Royal Navy officer) (1836–1896), British Admiral
 Frederick Robinson (Wisconsin pharmacist) (1824–1893), Wisconsin state assemblyman
 Frederick B. Robinson (1883–1941), academic
 Frederick Robinson (Massachusetts politician) (1799–1882), Massachusetts politician
 Frederick A. Robinson, American football coach
 Frederick Cayley Robinson (1862–1927), English painter, decorator and illustrator
 Frederick Oliver Robinson (1903–1969), Ontario machinist and political figure
 Frederick Walter Robinson (1888–1971), Australian academic at the University of Queensland
 Frederick William Robinson (1830–1901), English novelist

See also
 Fred Robinson (disambiguation)